Lucas John "Luke" Helder (born May 5, 1981) also known as the Midwest Pipe Bomber, is an American domestic terrorist and former University of Wisconsin–Stout student from Pine Island, Minnesota.

Bombings 
In 2002, while attending the University of Wisconsin–Stout, Helder planned to plant pipe bombs in mailboxes across the United States to create a smiley face shape on the United States map. The bombs, which were packed with BBs and nails, were rigged to explode as the mailboxes were opened. Completed and rigged bombs were found in Nebraska, Colorado, Texas, Illinois and Iowa. In Iowa, six people, including four mail carriers, were injured when the bombs detonated. Ultimately, Helder planted 18 bombs and covered . 

He was stopped by police in Nebraska, Oklahoma, and Colorado for speeding and failure to wear a seat belt, but was not arrested.
Eventually he was captured in rural Nevada before he managed to complete the full smile. At the time of his arrest, police were looking for an unknown suspect driving a black Honda Accord. Many newspapers reported that he was wearing a Kurt Cobain T-shirt. The bombings were heavily covered by the US news media.

Personality, writings and theories 

Helder was not at the top of his college class, but his teachers described him as a reasonably good, quiet and polite student, and at first there was confusion as to what the motivation for the bombings could be. Family, friends, and many acquaintances referred to Helder as normal and without a propensity to hurt people, though his roommate noted he had recently become obsessed with death, had begun smoking marijuana, and had been reciting extended monologues about his new spiritual beliefs to his friends (which they had mostly "laughed off").

Within the year prior to his arrest, Helder had become passionate about astral projection techniques and came to believe that death of the flesh and body is not the end of existence, as evidenced by the manifesto he sent to The Badger Herald of the University of Wisconsin–Madison at the beginning of the bombing spree. The essay also includes statements such as "I'm taking very drastic measure in attempt to provide this information to you... I will die/change in the end for this, but that's ok, hahaha paradise awaits! I'm dismissing a few individuals from reality, to change all of you for the better"Lagorio, Christine. "News Analysis: Newspapers receipt of shady mail a daily occurrence." The Badger Herald May 10, 2002

Notes attached to the bombs went on to denounce government control over daily lives, deny that anyone who had died was really dead, and promised more of the same kind of message.

Trial 
In April 2004, a federal judge found Helder incompetent to stand trial. While a judge could free Helder if doctors find he is not a threat to society, legal experts doubt this possibility due to the violent nature of his crimes. He has been diagnosed with schizoaffective disorder.

In 2013, a federal judge ordered Helder re-evaluated for competency to stand trial. Helder remains incarcerated in the Federal Medical Center in Rochester, Minnesota.

Musical background 
Prior to his bombing spree, Helder was a member of Apathy, a Rochester, Minnesota, three-piece grunge band. Although the band was successful only on a local scale, they recorded a CD, Sacks of People, at the end of their first summer together. They funded and released the album themselves. Helder was a fan of Kurt Cobain. He heavily decorated his dorm room with Nirvana (Cobain's band) posters and ephemera. A bandmate in Apathy remarked Helder had "an interesting style of singing" and would write much of the lyrics of the group's tracks, not having a full understanding of their meaning.

When the news broke that Helder was the pipe bomber, the media made significant mention of his status as a musician. Many music critics scrambled to acquire copies of Apathy's CD, some of which were auctioned on eBay for as much as $200.

See also 
Improvised explosive device
Ted Kaczynski
Austin serial bombings

References

External links
 Timeline of Helder's news, WQAD-TV
 The Smoking Gun archive on Luke Helder, with the six-page manifesto

1981 births
Living people
People from Pine Island, Minnesota
University of Wisconsin–Stout alumni
American male criminals
American people imprisoned on charges of terrorism
American people of Dutch descent
Guitarists from Minnesota
Bombers (people)
Explosions in 2002
Improvised explosive device bombings in the United States
People from Menomonie, Wisconsin
People with schizoaffective disorder
Serial bombers